The Maharana Pratap Inter-State Bus Terminus (ISBT) popularly known as Kashmere Gate ISBT, located in Delhi is the oldest and one of the biggest Inter State Bus Terminals in India. It operates bus services between Delhi and 7 other regions: Haryana, Jammu and Kashmir, Punjab, Himachal Pradesh, Uttar Pradesh, Rajasthan and Uttarakhand. Spread over an area of about 5.3 acres, it handles over 1800 buses a day.

History
Kashmere Gate ISBT was opened in 1976. It served as the only ISBT in Delhi till 1993 when it was transferred to the Transport Department, after which two new ISBT's were created in Sarai Kale Khan and Anand Vihar to de-congest the overcrowded Kashmere Gate ISBT. It was renovated in 2011-2012 by DIMTS at a cost of ₹ 70 Crores and then inaugurated in 2013 by then Chief Minister of Delhi, Sheila Dikshit.

Services
The Terminus has 45 departure bus bays, eight idle bus bays and 13 arrival bus bays, all catering to Inter-State Buses or Buses to other ISBT's in Delhi. Local buses for other parts of capital are being operated from the mini bus stand which is known as D.T.C. Block at Inter State Bus Terminus Kashmere Gate.

Facilities
The departure block, waiting area and food court are centrally air conditioned. Reverse Osmosis plants have been installed to supply clean drinking water to the passengers. high speed, secured Wi-Fi zone allows passengers to remain connected. To keep the building environment friendly a sewage treatment plant has been installed with the capacity of 1000 cubic meter per day. The sewage water is treated and recycled to be used in the air-conditioning plant and for the purpose of horticulture and flushing of toilets. A new parking management system has also been developed which is capable of storing data of buses entering and exiting the premises. high resolution CCTV cameras have also been installed for surveillance.

See also

 Delhi
 Transport in Delhi
 Sarai Kale Khan Inter-State Bus Terminus
 Kashmere Gate metro station
 Inter State Bus Terminals
 Swami Vivekanand Inter State Bus Terminus

References

External links

Transport in Delhi
Bus stations in India
Memorials to Maharana Pratap